Transactional law is the practice of private law relating to money, business, and commerce. Areas of focus include providing legal aid to entrepreneurs through contract drafting, real estate acquisition, and intellectual property affairs. Transactional law firms differ from traditional litigation firms in that transactional firms generally prefer to resolve disputes out of court.

References

Business law
Private law